Patrick Baty FRSA (born 1956) is a British historian of architectural paint and colour, who works as a consultant in the decoration of historic buildings.

Early years
He was educated at St Benedict's School, in London, and after a short period as a private soldier in the Parachute Regiment attended the Royal Military Academy Sandhurst being commissioned into the 9th/12th Royal Lancers in 1976.  He resigned his commission in 1980 when his newly posted commanding officer opposed his secondment to the Sultan of Oman's Armed Forces.  Reverting to the rank of Trooper he undertook Selection for the Artists Rifles leaving as a Captain some ten years later.

After a brief spell with the Anthony d'Offay gallery he joined his family paint business Papers and Paints.  Having always had an interest in historic buildings he began a study of the methods and materials employed in their decoration.  In 1993 he completed a part-time degree in the subject at the University of East London.

Recent career
Patrick Baty has acted as a consultant on many major restoration projects in the United Kingdom.  He was a long-standing committee member of the Georgian Group and a Fellow of both the Society of Antiquaries of Scotland and the Royal Society for the encouragement of Arts, Manufactures & Commerce.  Baty is a founding member of both the Traditional Paint Forum and the Architectural Paint Group.

Projects
Projects have ranged from King Henry VIII's heraldic Beasts; Baroque churches; country houses; wartime RAF stations and London housing estates to structures such as Tower Bridge and Holborn Viaduct. He also works in the USA.

Work with colour
In the 1980s Patrick Baty produced a range of paint colours based on those offered by a Scottish house-painter in 1807, this sparked off the present wave of historically-themed paint ranges which are still seen today.   In April 2000, Homes & Gardens described him as being "Undoubtedly the most influential of our (paint) experts…whose breadth and depth of knowledge is unrivalled".  In recent years, on two separate occasions, he has been employed by ICI (Dulux) and The Little Greene to develop ranges of traditional paint colours for English Heritage.  Colour ranges have also been produced for the French and German markets. The colours traditionally employed on the exteriors of buildings in Bath, Edinburgh, Penzance and in Gloucester have been investigated for the local planning authorities and guidelines produced for them.  The colours used on the exteriors of Chelsea houses in the 19th century have also been identified and an article published for the Chelsea Society.  He has recently finished work on a range of exterior colours based on regional use in France.  A similar project looking at regional colour in the United Kingdom is in progress.

In 2007 his company, Papers and Paints, was awarded a Royal Warrant for his work with colour.

Personal life
He is married with a daughter and two sons.

Patrick Baty is the great grandson of the artists Robert Polhill Bevan and his wife, Stanisława de Karłowska. His direct ancestors also include Silvanus Bevan (The Banker), and his wife, Louise Kendall Bevan,  Timothy Bevan and his wife, Elizabeth Barclay Bevan, David Bevan and his wife, Favell Bourke Lee Bevan, Robert Cooper Lee Bevan, and his wife, Lady Agneta Elizabeth Yorke Bevan, Robert Barclay (The Quaker Apologist), David Barclay) among several others.
Sir Philip Hendy, Director of the National Gallery (1946–1967), commented that the aforementioned Robert Polhill
Bevan was perhaps the first Englishman to use pure colour in the 20th Century.

Lecturing and writing
Baty lectures often on the general subject of paint and colour of the 18th and 19th centuries.  The audiences range widely from the staff of the national amenity organisations, to preservation enthusiasts.  He has been a frequent lecturer on graduate and postgraduate courses at several universities, to architects on Continuing Professional Development courses, and to conservation officers.  He has spoken at a number of international symposia in Europe, and lectured and run courses along the East coast of the United States.

His published works are listed here and he has also contributed to and edited various other books on the subject of paint and colour; Robert Bevan and also on The Artists Rifles.

Select Bibliography
 "Palette of Historic Paints."  Country Life, 20 Feb. 1992: 56–57.
 "Palette of the Past." Country Life, 3 Sep. 1992: 44–47.
 House Decoration, by Paul Hasluck. An introduction to the facsimile edition. Donhead Publishing, Dorset. 2001.
 "Inspired by the Past?" In John Fowler: The Invention of the Country-House Style. Donhead Publishing, Dorset. 2005. This paper follows the English Heritage/Traditional Paint Forum conference Inspired by the Past that took place in London on 4 July 2001.
 "The Colours of Chelsea." The Chelsea Society Report, 2003.
 "The Colours of Calke." The World of Interiors, December 2007: 139–143.
 "Exterior Colour on the Smaller Town House" in Materials & Skills for Historic Building Conservation. Blackwell Publishing, Oxford. 2008.
 "Straws from Cumberland Market" in the catalogue for an exhibition of works of art at Southampton City Art Gallery entitled "A Countryman in Town: Robert Bevan and the Cumberland Market Group”. 26 September to 14 December 2008.
 "The Colourful Past of the Royal Festival Hall" in Architectural Finishes in the Built Environment. Archetype Books, London. 2009.
 "Paint Colour and Paintwork" in Interior Finishes & Fittings for Historic Building Conservation. Blackwell Publishing, Oxford. 2012.
 (Contribution to) Metals. English Heritage Practical Building Conservation. Ashgate Publishing. 2012.
 "Family Colours". Tate Magazine (issue 27: Spring 2013): 27–29.
 The Anatomy of Colour. Thames & Hudson. 2017.

References

External links
Architectural Paint and Colour Consultant
Patrick Baty's published work
Patrick Baty's website

Living people
1956 births
People educated at St Benedict's School, Ealing
Graduates of the Royal Military Academy Sandhurst
9th/12th Royal Lancers officers
Artists' Rifles officers
English historians
English male non-fiction writers
Bevan family